Cosmopterix panopla is a moth in the  family Cosmopterigidae. It is found in Sri Lanka.

References

Natural History Museum Lepidoptera generic names catalog

panopla